"Animals" is a song by American pop rock band Maroon 5. It was released on August 25, 2014, as the second single from the band's fifth studio album V (2014). The song was written by Adam Levine, Benny Blanco and its producer Shellback.

The song peaked at number three on the US Billboard Hot 100 giving Maroon 5 their tenth top 10 single in the U.S.

Promotion
To promote the song, Kia Motors debuted an advertisement of 2015 Kia Soul EV model on August 21, 2014. For a limited time after the commercial premiered, "Animals" was available for free download on the Kia website only. Later, Maroon 5 released the song's lyric video on August 22, 2014, from their YouTube channel. The commercial also appeared at the 2014 MTV Video Music Awards on August 24, and the song was released the next day.

Remixes
The remix versions of "Animals" featuring with American rappers, J. Cole released on September 30, 2014, and Big Boi premiered execlusively on Pigeons & Planes website on December 18, both written and produced by Freaky Ta, DCBC and Aftermath artist Me3mo (Sameem Nadeem).

Critical reception
Rolling Stone ranked "Animals" at number 32 on its year-end list of the 50 best songs of 2014.

Music video
The music video was released on September 29, 2014 on Vevo. Directed by Samuel Bayer, the video features Adam Levine and his wife, Behati Prinsloo who portrays the woman. The other musicians of Maroon 5 (including their touring member Sam Farrar, the first time he appeared in a music video with the band) also make an appearance - they are seen playing at a nightclub in some scenes of the video. The story of the video is inspired by the film American Psycho (2000).

Synopsis

The video starts with a woman entering a slaughterhouse, where Levine's character works. After she leaves, an infatuated Levine begins to stalk the woman by following her in the streets and standing outside her apartment in the pouring rain to watch her. He also watches the woman in her sleep and takes numerous photos of Prinsloo, which he later trims and places on wires around a dark room. Intercut with this are scenes of a shirtless Levine dripping in fake blood, singing the song inside a meat locker and using animal carcasses for punching bags (an apparent reference to Rocky). One evening, Levine follows the woman into a nightclub, where he tries to talk to her. Though Prinsloo is amused by Levine and his interest in her, she spends the evening talking to her girlfriends instead. Eventually, Levine is left with no luck, so he goes back to fantasizing about the girl. After an erotic dream, Levine wakes up in a shock and returns to stalking Prinsloo by standing outside her apartment in the rain watching in a dazed state, leading to the similar opening. The final scenes feature Levine and Prinsloo as obsessed lovers having sex while covered in blood (an apparent reference to Carrie).

Reception and controversy
The music video was heavily panned by critics and has been condemned for dehumanizing women and glamorizing violence. Jessica Valenti of The Guardian criticized the video for attempting to make violence against women seem "edgy" stating that "there is nothing 'alternative' about showing women being stalked, hunted, raped or killed because it’s something that happens every damn day." RAINN (Rape, Abuse & Incest National Network) released a statement condemning the video, which wrote that  "No one should ever confuse the criminal act of stalking with romance. The trivialisation of these serious crimes, like stalking, should have no place in the entertainment industry." 

In a 2018 interview with The Independent, Levine dismissed the criticism, calling it "fucking ridiculous", and saying about the video, "It was supposed to be creepy! I play the role of the creep, it's literally a character out of a movie. And the song is about animalistic tendencies, I'm talking about eating someone alive. Use your fucking imagination. It's like watching a horror film and notifying the people who made it to tell them you think they're disgusting. People are sometimes too rooted in reality and they can't differentiate. They take everything too personally."

Chart performance
Commercially in the United States, "Animals" debuted at number 86 on the US Billboard Hot 100 chart. On October 8, 2014, the song rose from the number 33 to 8, giving the band their tenth top-ten hit overall and their seventh consecutive Hot 100 top-ten hit since the 2011 chart-topping single "Moves like Jagger". The song reached its million sales mark in the US in November 2014. The song peaked at number three on the Billboard Hot 100 issue dating November 22, 2014 and spent fourteen weeks in the top 10.

In other countries, "Animals" has made the top-ten progress as well, reaching number 2 in Canada. It is also a moderate success in the United Kingdom, where it charted at number 27.

Live performances
On October 20, 2014, Maroon 5 performed "Animals" for the 2014 NRJ Music Tour at Maison de la Mutualité in Paris, France. The same month, Maroon 5 performed the song on Saturday Night Live (along with "Maps"), as well as The X Factor, and the television talk shows C à vous (C to You) in France and The Graham Norton Show in the UK, respectively. On November 10, 2014, Maroon 5 performed the song on the seventh season of The Voice. In December 2014, the band performed "Animals" in a mash-up with "This Love" for A Very Grammy Christmas concert (December 5) at the Shrine Auditorium in Los Angeles, California, and performed the song at the iHeartRadio Jingle Ball Tour 2014 (December 12) in Madison Square Garden, New York City.

The band played the track in Puerto Rico for the first edition of Victoria's Secret Swim Special, which aired on February 26, 2015. On April 3, 2016, Maroon 5 played the song at the 2016 Capital One JamFest in Houston. It is part of a setlist for the worldwide concert tour, the Maroon V Tour (2015–2018).

Track listing

Digital download
"Animals" – 3:51
Digital download – Remix featuring J Cole
"Animals" (Remix) (featuring J Cole) – 4:00
Digital download – Remix featuring Big Boi
"Animals" (Remix) (featuring Big Boi) – 4:00
Digital download – Gryffin Remix
"Animals" (Gryffin Remix) – 5:18

Digital download – Danny Olson Remix
"Animals" (Danny Olson Remix) – 5:00
Digital download – Sammy Bananas Remix
"Animals" (Sammy Bananas Remix) – 5:40
Digital download – Zaeden Remix
"Animals" (Zaeden Remix) – 5:00

Credits and personnel
Credits adapted from the liner notes of V.

Locations
Recorded at Conway Studios, Los Angeles; MXM Studios, Stockholm
Mixed at MixStar Studios, Virginia Beach

Personnel

Songwriting – Adam Levine, Shellback, Benjamin Levin
Production – Shellback
Lead vocals – Adam Levine
Instrumentation, background vocals, programming – Shellback
Mixing – Serban Ghenea
Vocals recording – Shellback, Max Martin
Engineering – Noah Passovoy
Assistant engineers – Eric Eylands, Tim Roberts
Mix engineer – John Hanes
Lead and rhythm guitar – James Valentine, Jesse Carmichael
Bass – Mickey Madden
Drums and percussion – Matt Flynn
Keyboards and synthesizers – Jesse Carmichael, PJ Morton

Charts

Weekly charts

Year-end charts

Certifications

Release history

References

2014 songs
2014 singles
Songs written by Adam Levine
Songs written by Shellback (record producer)
Songs written by Benny Blanco
Maroon 5 songs
222 Records singles
Interscope Records singles
Song recordings produced by Shellback (record producer)
Music videos directed by Samuel Bayer
American dance-pop songs
Songs about stalking
Music video controversies
Obscenity controversies in music
Torch songs
Songs about animals